"Recovery" is a song recorded by Canadian singer Justin Bieber for his second compilation album, Journals (2013). The song was released on October 28, 2013, as a digital download. The song is the fourth in Bieber's series Music Mondays, the first three being "Heartbreaker" (October 7), "All That Matters" (October 14) and "Hold Tight" (October 21). Bieber released a new single every week for 10 weeks from October 7 to December 9, 2013.

"Recovery" heavily interpolates the guitar riff from Craig David's "Fill Me In".

Track listing

Charts

References

2013 singles
Justin Bieber songs
2013 songs
Songs written by Justin Bieber
Songs written by Craig David
Songs written by Mark Hill (musician)
Island Records singles
Song recordings produced by the Audibles
Songs written by James Giannos
Songs written by Dominic Jordan